Duratón River Gorges Natural Park is a natural park of ,
  west of Sepúlveda, Segovia, Castile and León, Spain.

Saint Fructus (San Frutos) established himself here as a hermit in the 8th century; a monastery dedicated to him also exists within the park.

The park surrounds the pre-existing villages of Sepúlveda, Sebúlcor, and Carrascal del Río.

It is home to a population of griffon vultures, along with Egyptian vultures, common kestrels, and peregrine falcons.

References

External links

 PARQUE NATURAL DE LAS HOCES DEL RÍO DURATÓN
 PARQUE NATURAL DE LAS HOCES

Natural parks of Spain
Special Protection Areas of Spain
Protected areas established in 1989
Canyons and gorges of Spain
Protected areas of Castile and León
Landforms of Castile and León
1989 establishments in Spain